The Ural Oblast was an oblast of the RSFSR within the USSR. It was created November 3, 1923 by the merger of Perm, Yekaterinburg, Chelyabinsk and Tyumen Governorates. The capital of the oblast was Sverdlovsk. At the time of its creation area of oblast was 1,659,000 km2 and the population was 6,380,000.

On February 26, 1925, Komi-Permyak Okrug was separated from the western portion of the oblast.

In 1927, the oblast was divided into 16 okrugs and 210 rayons. Okrugs included: Verkhne-Kamsky, Zlatoustovsky, Irbitsky, Ishimsky, Komi-Permyatsky, Kungursky, Kurgansky, Permsky, Sarapulsky, Sverdlovsky, Tagilsky, Tobolsky, Troitsky, Tyumensky, Chelyabinsky and Shadrinsky.  
Borders between okrugs and rayons often changed.

On August 8, 1930, okrugs were abolished. On December 10, 1930, Ostyak-Vogul and Yamal (Nenets) national okrugs were created in the northern part of former Tobolsky okrug. On January 17, 1934, the oblast was abolished and was replaced by Sverdlovsk, Chelyabinsk and Ob-Irtysh oblasts. 
At the end of 1933, the oblast's area was 1,896,000 km2.

References

Oblasts of the Russian Soviet Federative Socialist Republic